Montsweag Bay is a small brackish water bay near Wiscasset, Maine. It connects to Hockomock Bay, which connects with many more bays and eventually to the Atlantic Ocean. The peninsula known as Chewonki Neck juts out into the bay between Westport Island and the town of Woolwich and is the home of the Chewonki Foundation.

See also
 List of bays of Maine

Bays of Maine
Bodies of water of Lincoln County, Maine
Peninsulas of Maine